Tobias Siegert is a Grand Prix motorcycle racer from Germany.

Career statistics

By season

Races by year
(key)

References

External links
 Profile on motogp.com

1991 births
Living people
German motorcycle racers
125cc World Championship riders
Sportspeople from Nuremberg